The Samsung Galaxy M30 is an Android phablet produced by Samsung Electronics. It was unveiled on 27 February 2019. The phone comes with Android 8 (Oreo) with Samsung's proprietary One UI skin, 32, 64 or 128 GB of internal storage, and a 5000 mAh Li-Po battery.

Availability
The M30 is aimed primarily at the Indian market where the base model retails for 9,999 rupees. It is sold exclusively on Amazon.in and Samsung's official online retail store. In China and Taiwan, it is sold as the Samsung Galaxy A40s.

Specifications

Software
The M30 runs on Android Oreo, now upgradable to Android 10.

Hardware
The M30 has a 6.4-inch FHD+ Super AMOLED display. It is powered by Exynos 7904 SoC with a 14 nm octa-core CPU and Mali-G71 GPU, and has a 5000 mAh battery with fast charging. It comes with 3GB RAM and 32GB ROM, 4GB RAM and 64GB ROM or 6GB RAM and 128GB ROM. Storage is expandable via a dedicated microSD card slot up to 512GB.

It has a triple camera system that includes a 13 megapixel main sensor, a 5 megapixel depth sensor and a 5 megapixel ultra-wide sensor. It includes a 16 megapixel front camera.

The phone has a fingerprint scanner, 4G, VoLTE, WiFi, Bluetooth 5 and GPS. It comes with a USB Type-C port.

The phone comes with Widevine L1 Certification, allowing it to stream HD content from different video streaming websites. It also supports Dolby ATMOS 360° surround sound.
The Samsung Galaxy M30s comes with a 6.4” FHD+ (1080×2340) Super AMOLED Infinity-U Display with a U-shaped notch for the frontal camera, similar to the Samsung Galaxy M30s. This results in a screen-to-body ratio of 90%. The display has a contrast ratio of 78960:1 and a max brightness of 420 nits. The phone has a 5000 mAh Li-Po battery supporting wired 15W fast charging.

References

External links

Android (operating system) devices
Samsung mobile phones
Samsung smartphones
Mobile phones introduced in 2019
Samsung Galaxy
Mobile phones with multiple rear cameras